Nikolayevka is a rural locality (a selo) and the administrative centre of Nikolayevsky Selsoviet, Tuymazinsky District, Bashkortostan, Russia. The population was 724 as of 2010. There are 10 streets.

Geography 
Nikolayevka is located 28 km southeast of Tuymazy (the district's administrative centre) by road. Aytaktamak is the nearest rural locality.

References 

Rural localities in Tuymazinsky District